Garkan-e Sofla (also Romanized as Garkān-e Soflá and Garekān-e Soflá) is a village in the Yusefvand Rural District, which is within the Central District of Selseleh County, Lorestan Province, Iran. At the 2006 census, its population was 470, with 98 families.

References

Towns and villages in Selseleh County